Charles Ashley may refer to:

Charles S. Ashley (1858–1941), mayor of New Bedford, Massachusetts, 1897–1905
Charles Jane Ashley (1773–1843), English musician
General Charles Ashley (c. 1770–1818), English musician
Charles F. Ashley (1936–2011), American politician in the Alabama House of Representatives

See also